No Matter How Narrow is the second album by the Long Island indie rock band The Republic of Wolves. It was originally released on iTunes and physically on their web store on December 17, 2013. It has also been released on vinyl record by Simple Stereo. The album was recorded in the band's home studio and was mixed by band member Mason Maggio. The album was mastered by Alex Saltz (APS Mastering, NYC).

Track listing
All songs written by Mason Maggio, Billy Duprey, Christian Van Deurs, and Gregg Andrew Dellarocca.
Tracks 1-5 and 7-11 feature Dan Gluszak (of Envy On The Coast) on drums.
Track 6 features Will Noon (of Straylight Run and fun.) on drums.
Tracks 6, 8, and 11 feature Natalie Kress on violin.
Track 8 features a spoken monologue by Nate Dimeo.

References

External links
The Republic of Wolves on iTunes
The Republic of Wolves - No Matter How Narrow on Simple Stereo

2013 albums
The Republic of Wolves albums
Self-released albums